Hot News is a 1953 American crime film directed by Edward Bernds and starring Stanley Clements, Gloria Henry and Ted de Corsia. An ex-boxer now working as a sportswriter goes after a gambling syndicate attempting to control the fight game.

Plot

Cast
 Stanley Clements as Mark Miller - Reporter  
 Gloria Henry as Kerry Barker  
 Ted de Corsia as Dino Rizzo  
 Veda Ann Borg as Doris Burton  
 Scotty Beckett as Bill Burton  
 Mario Siletti as Dominic  
 Carl Milletaire as 'Dutch' Gordon  
 James Flavin as Al Bragg  
 Hal Baylor as Augie Grotz  
 Paul Bryar as Doc Allen  
 Myron Healey as  Jim O'Hara  
 Greta Granstedt as Maid

References

Bibliography
 Darby, William. Masters of Lens and Light: A Checklist of Major Cinematographers and Their Feature Films. Scarecrow Press, 1991.

External links
 

1953 films
1953 crime films
American crime films
Monogram Pictures films
Films directed by Edward Bernds
American black-and-white films
1950s English-language films
1950s American films